René Théodore Berthon (1776–1859) was a French painter of religious and historical subjects, and of portraits.

Life
Berthon was born at Tours in 1776, and studied under David. He painted scriptural and historical subjects, and a large number of portraits, which, although of no great merit, gained him a certain reputation in the days of the first empire and the restoration. Among his portraits are those of Napoleon I when First Consul, Pauline Bonaparte, Mademoiselle Duchesnois, and
Lady Morgan. Several of his historical pictures are at Versailles. He died in Paris in 1859.

His daughter, Sidonie Berthon, a miniature painter, was a pupil of her father and of Mme de Mirbel. She was born in Paris in 1817, and died in 1871.

His son, George Théodore Berthon, was a portrait artist who emigrated to England and then to Canada.

References

Sources
 

18th-century French painters
French male painters
19th-century French painters
1776 births
1859 deaths
Artists from Tours, France
Pupils of Jacques-Louis David
18th-century French male artists